David Tal (born  1964) is an Israeli historian and professor. Since 2009, he has been the Kahanoff Chair in Israeli Studies at the University of Calgary. He is an expert on Israel's security and diplomatic history, as well as U.S. disarmament policy.

Biography 
Tal completed all his undergraduate and graduate study in history at Tel Aviv University, receiving his BA in 1986, his MA in 1990, and his PhD in 1995. He was an instructor in the department of history at Tel Aviv University from 1994–1996 and a lecturer in that department and in the Program of Security Studies from 1996–2005. He was a NATO research fellow from 2000–2002.

Since 2005, Tal has been a visiting professor at Emory University, Atlanta, Georgia (2005–2006, 2008–2009), Syracuse University, Syracuse, New York  (2006–2008). in 2009 he joined the history department at  the University of Calgary as a professor and the Kahanoff Chair in Israeli Studies. Calgary, Alberta, Canada. i(2009–present). in 2014 he moved to the University of Sussex, UK, where he is holding the Yossi Harel Chair in Modern Israel Studies.

Selected bibliography

Books 
  (with Anat Kurz and Maskit Burgin)

Articles 
 Tal, David (1995). "The American-Israeli Security Treaty: Sequel or means to the relief of Israeli-Arab tension, 1954–1955". Middle Eastern Studies 31:4, pp. 828–848.
 Tal, David (February 1996). "Israel's Road to the 1956 War". International Journal of Middle East Studies, 67.
 Tal, David (1998). "Israel's Conception of Routine Security Measures". Ben Gurion University of the Negev.
 Tal, David (June 2000). "Symbol or Substance? Israel's campaign for U.S. Hawk missiles, 1960–1962". International History Review, 22:2.
 Tal, David (Spring/Summer 2000). "The Forgotten War: The Jewish-Palestinian strife in Palestine, December 1947–May 1948". Israel Affairs, 6:3–4.
 
 Tal, David (2004). "The Battle over Jerusalem: The Israeli-Jordanian War, 1948", in Alon Kadish (ed.), Israel's War of Independence Revisited (Tel Aviv: Ministry of Defense, 2004), pp. 307–339.
 Tal, David (Autumn 2005). "The 1948 War in Palestine Historiography: The missing dimension". Journal of Israeli History 24:2, pp. 183–202.
 Tal, David (Fall 2008). "From the Open Skies Proposal of 1955 to the Norstad Plan of 1960: A plan too far". Journal of Cold War Studies, 10:4, pp. 66–93.

References

External links 
David Tal curriculum vitae

Historians of Israel
Israeli historians
Jewish historians
Israeli Jews
1960s births
Living people
Tel Aviv University alumni